Rafiquddin Ahmad (1 March 1932 – 13 September 2013) was chairman of Bangladesh Engineering and Shipbuilding Corporation. Throughout his career he was the founding chairman of Bangladesh Chemical Industries Corporation (BCIC), was founding director of ICTVTR, now known as Islamic University of Technology (IUT),  was founding member of The Institute of Engineers, Bangladesh and former Chairman of Bangladesh Steel and Engineering Corporation (BSEC). Rafiquddin Ahmad obtained his PhD from UK in 1960 and became a teacher of Bangladesh University of Engineering and Technology (BUET). He was also a key member in establishing Eastern Cables, the first exported item from Bangladesh to west Europe.

References

External links
http://www.esamakal.net/pop_up.php?img_name=2013%2F09%2F15%2Fimages%2F02_117.jpg
http://unbconnect.com/ex-bsec-chairman-dr-rafiquddin-ahmed-passes-away/?panel1-1
http://www.thefinancialexpress-bd.com/index.php?ref=MjBfMDlfMTVfMTNfMV84OF8xODM0OTU=
http://www.daily-sun.com/index.php?view=details&archiev=yes&arch_date=14-09-2013&type=21-rescued-in-Benapole-while-being-trafficked-to-India&pub_no=615&cat_id=1&menu_id=0&news_type_id=3&index=18

1932 births
2013 deaths
20th-century Bangladeshi businesspeople
Place of birth missing